The 2010–11 W-League season was the third season of the W-League, the Australian national women's football (soccer) competition. The season consisted of twelve rounds, with each team playing a total of ten games, followed by a finals series.

Sydney FC were crowned premiers after winning the regular season, but lost the Grand Final to season runners-up Brisbane Roar.

Clubs

The Central Coast Mariners withdrew from the 2010–11 season prior to the season commencing.
W-League teams for the 2010–11 season:

Regular season

League table

Round 1

Round 2

Round 3

Round 4

Round 5

Round 6

Round 7

Round 8

Round 9

Round 10

Round 11

Round 12

Finals series

Bracket

Semi-finals

Final

Season Statistics

Leading scorers

Awards

Player of the Year: Kyah Simon, Sydney FC
Young Player of the Year: Kyah Simon, Sydney FC
Goalkeeper of the Year: Lydia Williams, Canberra United
Golden Boot: Kyah Simon, Sydney FC – 12 goals
Goal of the Year: Heather Garriock, Sydney FC – Round 1, Brisbane Roar v Sydney FC
Fair Play Award: Melbourne Victory
Referee of the Year: Kate Jacewicz
Coach of the Year: Alen Stajcic, Sydney FC

See also

 2010–11 Adelaide United W-League season
 2010–11 Sydney FC W-League season

References

 
2010–11
Aus
1